Wilfred Green may refer to:

Wilfrid Greene, 1st Baron Greene (1883–1952) British lawyer and judge
Wilfred Green (RAF officer) (1898–?), English World War I flying ace
Shorty Green (Wilfred Thomas Green, 1896–1960), Canadian professional ice hockey player